Beyond the Edge is a 2018 Russian science fiction heist film directed by Aleksandr Boguslavskiy and Francesco Cinquemani. Michael, a talented gambler, gathers a team of people with supernatural powers to win big at a casino. But at the game he finds himself up against a much stronger mystical rival and ends up in a deadlock putting in danger himself and his team that he has grown to love. It stars Miloš Biković, Antonio Banderas and Lyubov Aksyonova.

The film was released in Russia on March 1, 2018.

Plot
Michael is a talented gambler who thinks through his every move and counts only on himself. He plans a heist at a luxury European casino. Michael rolls out his scheme brilliantly, until he runs up against a mysterious rival (Alex) at a poker table. During the game Michael's cards mysteriously change in his hands. He loses everything, and his scheme gets blown up. Victor – a cruel and dangerous casino owner – is sure that Michael and Alex work together. Victor says that Michael must repay a huge debt – everything that Alex won – and gives him a week to comply.

Michael seems to be facing a deadlock but gathers a team of experts with superpowers to quickly win at a casino and repay the debt. The superpowers of his team members help Michael skip a long preparation process.

Eric is a rich kid, a party boy who has a slight power of telekinesis. He uses his power to move small objects (e.g., a roulette ball or cubes). Tony is a taxi driver who controls electronics, devices and tools. For example, he can turn a camera away at the right time. Kevin is a hypnotist and autistic, who can put any thought into anyone's head for a short interval.

Veronika is a telepath who can hear and transmit thoughts at a distance. Her power helps Michael communicate with his team so that no security service can overhear them.

Michael and his ‘supernatural’ team go to a casino to win big. He finds himself up against his mysterious rival and ends up putting himself and his team in danger.

Cast
 Miloš Biković as Michael 
 Antonio Banderas as Gordon
 Lyubov Aksyonova as Veronika, telepath.
 Yevgeny Stychkin as Tony, controls electronics.
 Yuri Chursin as Kevin, hypnotist, member of the scam team Michael
  as Eric, telekinesis.
 Petar Zekavica as Alex
  as Victor
 Nikita Dyuvbanov as Leon
 Alessandra Starr Ward as female supervisor

Production
Director Aleksandr Boguslavskiy decided to play Biković in roulette. Bikovich won and his remark was added to the film.

Producers turned to the casino's security chief for advice on making the film realistic.

Scenes in an underground casino, in a plane and in a forest were shot in a real Ilyushin Il-76 airplane, inside of which a game room was built.

Filming
Filming lasted a month during March–February 2016.

Casino scenes were filmed in Oracul casino, located in Azov-City, the first federal gambling zone on the border of the Rostov Oblast and the Krasnodar Krai. They filmed in former gambling establishment Golden Palace Casino. A number of scenes were filmed in the hotel Kosmos (both buildings are located in Moscow).

References

External links 
 Official website
 

2018 films
2010s Russian-language films
2010s action adventure films
2010s heist films
2018 science fiction action films
2010s science fiction adventure films
2010s superhero films
Russian action adventure films
Russian science fiction action films
Russian science fiction adventure films
Russian superhero films
Films about con artists
Films about psychic powers
Films about gambling